Rollins is an unincorporated community in Paulding County, in the U.S. state of Georgia.

History
A post office called Rollins was established in 1882, and remained in operation until 1903. W. L. Rollins, an early postmaster, gave the community his last name.

References

Unincorporated communities in Paulding County, Georgia
Unincorporated communities in Georgia (U.S. state)